The Women's World Floorball Championship is an international floorball competition contested by the senior women's national teams of the members of the International Floorball Federation (IFF), the sport's global governing body. It is distinct from the Floorball World Championships, which is for men's teams. Originally played in May-June, the IFF decided in 2007 to move the tournament to early-December starting in 2008.

Women

Results

Medal table

Participation details

Women Under-19

Results

Medal table

Participation details

See also
List of floorball world champions
Men's World Floorball Championship

References

External links
Women's World Championships at IFF website

 
International floorball competitions
Floorball women
Recurring sporting events established in 1997
December sporting events